The Padua Tramway serves Padova, a city in Veneto (Northern Italy).

The system built in the 21st century uses the French Translohr system (tramway sur pneumatiques, i.e. cars run on rubber tyres, a single central rail serving for guidance and return current).

History

The historic tramway having been closed down in 1954, first proposals for the reintroduction of tramways in Padua appeared in 1990. However, only in 1995 the Municipality of Padua was granted state contributions (for a total cost estimated at €61.3 million) provided by law 211 of 26 February 1992 (support for mass rapid transport systems). For Padua, a tramway linking Fornace to Prato della Valle was proposed, which corresponds to part of the current SIR line 1. Ansaldo Transportation, Adtranz, Siemens and Fiat Railway submitted tenders in 1999.

As the city council change following elections in 1999, no contract followed. To avoid losing state funding a technical committee was formed to rework the project. It drew up a new urban mobility plan, taking in consideration local opposition's fear of unsightingly overhead lines and rails in city streets. The new plans referred to an "integrated transport system using guideways".

The Europe wide public tendering for building the current line SIR 1 was won by a consortium led by De Simon, grace to two promises: cars should have steering wheels allowing to leave the tracks and the concrete guideways could be used by ordinary busses. However, the Translohr cars cannot be used off the guiding rail, leading to later criticism.
The original cost was given as  53 million euros, but increased by a further 15 million during construction.
Construction was then awarded to the Consortium Mantegna, consisting of the companies Rizzani de Eccher, Sicea, Lohr Industrie and De Simon. Work started on 31 March 2003 and ended in 2005, followed by test and driver training. During the test runs the Translohr system suffered five derailments.
A further derailment occurred on 22 April 2010 due to a misaligned switch.

Commercial operation of the service Translohr in Padua started 24 March 2007, the route length being , from the railway station to the southern terminus Guizza.

Gallery

Network Map

See also 
 List of rubber-tyred tram systems

References 

Padua
750 V DC railway electrification